The Claude Noel Highway, sometimes referred to as CNH, is one of the major west–east highways in Trinidad and Tobago, named after Claude Noel, it is the only highway in Tobago.  It runs from Canaan to Scarborough.

Description

Route 
The Claude Noel Highway is the only highway on the island of Tobago, connecting Milford Road to Windward Road, and providing direct access to Scarborough.

The highway begins just outside of Canaan at the junction with Shirvan Road. From here, the highway runs as a 2-lane single carriageway past Tobago Plantations, Lowlands, Carnbee, Lambeau and Scarborough before the route transfers to the Windward Road just outside Bacolet.

Features 
The highway is a 2 lane single carriageway for its entire length, where additional lanes are only found at junctions. Most intersections on the highway are signalized with the exception of a roundabout at Auchenskeoch Buccoo Bay Road. The speed limit is 80 kilometers per hour and overtaking is not permitted on most of the highway.

References

 

Roads in Trinidad and Tobago